1744 White Alto is a 2022 Indian Malayalam-language comedy crime drama film written and directed by Senna Hegde, featuring Sharafudheen, Rajesh Madhavan and Vincy Aloshious in the lead roles.

Cast
Sharafudheen as Inspector Mahesh
Rajesh Madhavan
Vincy Aloshious
Anand Manmadhan
Navas Vallikkunnu
Arun Kurian
Sajin Cherukayil
Arya Salim
Joji John
Nilja K Baby
Ranji Kankol
Sminu Sijo
Ashokan P, Kalyan Road

References

External links

2022 films
2020s Malayalam-language films
Indian crime comedy-drama films